Wavreille is a village of Wallonia and a district of the municipality of Rochefort, located in the province of Namur, Belgium.

References

External links

Former municipalities of Namur (province)